Due to the ongoing COVID-19 pandemic, people can sometimes be labelled, stereotyped, discriminated against, treated separately, or experience loss of status because of real or perceived links with the disease. As a result of such treatment, those who have or are perceived to have the disease, as well as their caregivers, family, friends, and communities, may be subjected to social stigma.

Due to the social stigma, individuals and groups have been subjected to racism and xenophobia and hate crimes, including physical attacks. The groups shown to be most vulnerable to social stigma are Asian people, in particular those of East Asian and Southeast Asian descent or appearance, people who have traveled abroad, people who have recently completed quarantine, healthcare professionals and emergency service workers. In fact, the Indian Ministry of Health and Family Welfare (MOHFW) issued a press release focused on limiting the scare associated with the said social stigma.

It has also been shown that wearing or refusing to wear a mask has become subject to a stigma as well. The existence of such social stigma and their negative impacts have been documented by many organizations, including UNICEF, the WHO, and the CDC.

Reasons for and impact of social stigma
The level of stigma towards those affected with COVID-19 is due to multiple factors. The virus is new, and there are many unknowns surrounding transmission and a possible cure. Many people cannot access tests and drug development for treatment is still in progress. Meanwhile, there is widespread misinformation regarding the disease, under which various online groups and activists have spread conspiracy theories and unproven claims, including: that the virus was created in a laboratory; the virus was "planned"; and that the virus was caused by 5G networks, among other theories. 

In this cultural context, the disease itself is an unknown—and, according to many international health experts, people feel fearful when confronted with the unknown. In such circumstances, they may deal with this fear by assigning blame to the "other,"  which may include groups of people, governments, or institutions. This environment can fuel harmful stereotypes. As a result, social cohesion is undermined, and there may be increased social isolation of impacted groups. With this social isolation, people may be less likely to seek out medical help or services, take necessary precautions, or seek out social services, due to fear of discrimination. This can contribute to a situation in which the virus is more likely to spread, leading to severe health problems and difficulties in controlling disease outbreak. Furthermore, people could also subjected to physical violence and hate crimes.

Addressing social stigma
In order to address social stigma, it is important to build trust in reliable health services and advice, show empathy to the affected individuals and adopting effective practical measures to keep people safe. The following measures are recommended to address social stigma by the UNICEF: 
 Use of people-first language, that respects the individual and talking about the disease with a positive tone in all communication channels, including media, such as:
 Not attaching ethnicity or locations to the disease, such as 'Chinese virus', 'Wuhan virus' or 'Asian virus' and using the official name COVID-19 or in a colloquial context the Coronavirus or Corona
 Using 'people who have COVID-19' instead of 'COVID-19 cases' or 'COVID-19 victims' or 'COVID-19 suspects'
 Using terminology like, people 'acquiring' or 'contracting' COVID-19 instead of people 'transmitting COVID-19', 'infecting others' or 'spreading the virus' as it implies intentional transmission and assigns blame
 Refrain from using criminalising or dehumanising terminology in a way that might create impression that those with the disease have done something wrong, thereby feeding stigma
 Speaking the facts about COVID-19 accurately, based on scientific data and latest official health advice
 Not repeating or sharing unconfirmed rumors, and avoiding using of exaggerative terms like 'plague' and 'apocalypse' to denote the pandemic
 Emphasizing the effectiveness of prevention and treatment measures, rather than dwelling on the negatives or messages of threat.
 Spreading accurate and updated facts, such as by:
 Using simple language and avoiding clinical terminology
 Engaging social influencers, such as religious or political leaders and celebrities to amplify the message in a geographically and culturally appropriate way
 Amplifying the stories and images of local people who have recovered or supported a loved one through the recovery from COVID-19
Portraying of different ethnic groups, and use of symbols and formats that are neutral and not suggestive of any ethnic group
Practicing ethical journalism: Reports that overly focus on patient responsibility can increase stigma for people who may have the disease. News that speculates the source of COVID-19 in each country, for example, can increase stigma towards such individuals.
Linking up to the other initiatives that address social stigma and stereotyping
 Observe communication tips:
Correct misconceptions, while acknowledging that people's feelings and subsequent behaviour are real, even if their underlying assumptions are false.
Share sympathetic narratives and stories that humanise the struggles of affected individuals and groups
Communicate support for those working in the frontline

According to United Nations Population Fund, midwives play an essential role in reducing stigma and battling the spreading belief that health facilities are to be avoided.

References

Social stigma
Discrimination
Social impact of the COVID-19 pandemic